Alexandra Kleeman is an American writer. Winner of the 2020 Rome Prize, her work has been reviewed in The New York Times, The Guardian, Vanity Fair, Vogue, and the Los Angeles Review of Books.

Early life and education
Kleeman was born in Berkeley, California, in 1986 to an American professor of religious studies and a Taiwanese teacher of Japanese literature. She grew up in Japan and Colorado. Kleeman studied creative writing and cognitive science at Brown University, and received an MFA from Columbia University in 2012.

Career
In 2010 Kleeman's short story "Fairy Tale" was published in The Paris Review while she was in her first semester of her MFA program. In 2015 her first novel You Too Can Have a Body Like Mine was published. You Too Can Have a Body Like Mine was longlisted for both the New York Book Critics Circle John Leonard Prize and Center for Fiction First Novel Prize. Her short story collection Intimations was published in 2016. Kleeman was the recipient of the 2016 Bard Fiction Prize for promising writers under the age of 40. In August 2021, Hogarth published Kleeman's novel Something New Under the Sun. 

Kleeman teaches writing at The New School in New York. She previously taught at Columbia University School of the Arts. She has written for The New Yorker, Paris Review, Harper's, Vogue, Zoetrope, New York Times Magazine, and n+1, among others.

Personal life
Kleeman is married to writer Alex Gilvarry and lives in Staten Island.

Bibliography
You Too Can Have a Body Like Mine, Harper, 2015, 
Intimations: Stories, Harper, 2016, 
Something New Under the Sun 2021

References

External links

New York Times Review of “Something New Under the Sun”

Living people
Brown University alumni
American women short story writers
American women novelists
21st-century American novelists
21st-century American women writers
Columbia University School of the Arts alumni
21st-century American short story writers
1986 births